Caladenia aestiva, commonly known as summer spider orchid, is a plant in the orchid family Orchidaceae and is endemic to south-eastern Australia. It is a ground orchid which grows singly or in small groups in the Australian Capital Territory and Victoria. It has one or two greenish-yellow to pale yellow flowers, often while the single, hairy leaf withers.

Description
The leaf is dull green and reddish near the base and often is withered by the time the flower opens.

The petals and sepals narrow abruptly at about their midpoint, linear nearer their bases then thread-like towards the ends. There are many short, tooth-like calli along the edges of the labellum and four to six rows of greenish to reddish calli in the centre. Flowering occurs from December to January and is often stimulated by bushfire. This species has been confused with Caladenia pallida since 1840, but has much larger flowers with somewhat more stiffly-held petals and sepals than C. pallida.

Taxonomy and naming
Caladenia aestiva was first formally described by David Jones in 1991 and the description was published in Australian Orchid Research. The type specimen was collected near the road between Benambra and Wulgulmerang. The specific epithet (aestiva) is a Latin word meaning "summer", in reference to the flowering season of this species.

Distribution and habitat
Summer spider orchid is widespread in north-eastern Victoria, growing in sheltered, grassy areas in high-altitude woodlands. In the Australian Capital Territory it is confined to the Brindabella Range.

References

External links
 

aestiva
Plants described in 1991
Endemic orchids of Australia
Orchids of the Australian Capital Territory
Orchids of Victoria (Australia)
Taxa named by David L. Jones (botanist)